Nerkin Shorzha is a village in the Vardenis Municipality of the Gegharkunik Province of Armenia. Nerkin Shorzha and nearby Verin Shorzha are both reached by a short drive from Ayrk.

References

External links 
 
 

Populated places in Gegharkunik Province